The Tunisian Volleyball Federation (FTVB), is the governing body for Volleyball in Tunisia since 1956. The federation is a member of the Arab Volleyball Association, Mediterranean volleyball Confederation, African Volleyball Confederation (CAVB) and the International Volleyball Federation (FIVB). The president of FTVB is Mohsen Ben taleb.

History
The Tunisian Federation has been recognised by FIVB from 1956 and is a member of the African Volleyball Confederation.

Presidents

Honours

National Team (Men)

 Summer Olympics
 Nine (1) :  1984

 World Championship
 Fifteen (1) : 2006

 World Cup
 Eight (2) : 1981, 1991

 World League
 Twenty Seven (1) : 2014

 Challenger Cup
 Six (1) : 2022

 African Championship (Record)
 Champions  (11) : 1967, 1971, 1979, 1987, 1995, 1997, 1999, 2003, 2017, 2019, 2021
 Runner-up  (7) : 1976, 1983, 1993, 2005, 2007, 2013, 2015
 Third place  (2) : 1991, 2011

 African Games
 Champions  (1) : 1978
 Runner-up  (3) : 1965, 1973, 2007
 Third place  (1) : 1991

 Mediterranean Games 
 Runner-up (2)  : 2001, 2013

 Arab Championship (Record)
 Champions  (8) : 1980, 1984, 1988, 1996, 2000, 2002, 2006, 2012
 Runner-up  (2) : 1998, 2008
 Third place  (1) : 1994

 Pan Arab Games (Record) 
 Champions  (3) : 1957, 1985, 1999
 Third place  (1) : 2004

 Afro-Arab Friendship Cup
 Champions  (1) : 1981

 Maghreb Championship (Record) 
 Champions  (7) : 1967, 1968, 1969, 1970, 1971, 1972, 1973

National Team (Women)

 Summer Olympics
 did not qualify

 World Championship
 Sixteen (1) : 1986

 World Cup
 Eight (1) : 1985

 African Championship
 Champions  (3) : 1985, 1987, 1999
 Runner-up  (2) : 1976, 2009
 Third place  (3) : 1995, 2007, 2013

 African Games
 did not qualify

 Mediterranean Games 
 Eight (1) : 2001

 Arab Championship
 Champions  (2) : 1980, 1989

 Pan Arab Games
 Runner-up  (3) : 1985, 1992, 1999

National team (U23)

 U23 World Championship
 Eight (1): 2013

 U23 African Championship
 Champions  (1) : 2014

National Junior team (Boys)

 U21 World Championship
 Five (1): 1993

 U21 African Championship (Record) 
 Champions  (10) : 1984, 1990, 1992, 1996, 1998, 2000, 2008, 2010, 2013, 2018    
 Runner-up  (5): 1994, 2002, 2004, 2006, 2022
 Third place  (1): 1986

National Youth team (Boys)

 Youth Olympic Games
 did not qualify

 U19 World Championship
 Six (1): 2009

 African Championship U19 (Record) 
 Champions  (8): 1994, 1997, 1998, 2000, 2006, 2008, 2010, 2016
 Runner-up  (4): 2002, 2004, 2013, 2015

 Arab Youth Championship
 Champions  (4): 1992, 1994, 1996, 2009
 Runner-up  (2) : 2011, 2013
 Third place  (1): 1998

National Girls team (U23)

 Women's U23 World Championship
 did not qualify

 Women's U23 African Championship
 Runner-up  (1) : 2014

National Junior team (Girls)

 Women's U20 World Championship
 Thirteen (1): 1995

 Women's Africa Championship U20
 Runner-up  (3) : 2006, 2010, 2017
 Third place  (2): 2002, 2006

National Youth team (Girls)

 Youth Olympic Games
 did not qualify

 Girls' U18 World Championship
 Thirteen (1): 2005

 Girls' Africa Championship U18
 Champions  (3): 2006, 2008, 2010
 Runner-up  (3) : 2004, 2013, 2014
 Third place  (1): 2011

See also
Tunisia men's national volleyball team
Tunisia women's national volleyball team
Tunisia men's national under-23 volleyball team
Tunisia men's national under-21 volleyball team
Tunisia men's national under-19 volleyball team
Tunisia women's national under-23 volleyball team
Tunisia women's national under-20 volleyball team
Tunisia women's national under-18 volleyball team
Tunisian Men's Volleyball League
Tunisian Volleyball Cup

References

External links 
 FTVB official site

Volleyball in Tunisia
Volleyball
Sports organizations established in 1956
National members of the African Volleyball Confederation
1956 establishments in Tunisia